The following is a list of viceroys of New Spain.

In addition to viceroys, the following lists the highest Spanish governors of the viceroyalty of New Spain, before the appointment of the first viceroy or when the office of viceroy was vacant. Most of these individuals exercised most or all of the functions of viceroy, usually on an interim basis.

Governor of the West Indies
This office covered the territories that were discovered by Christopher Columbus.
 1492–1499 – Christopher Columbus, as governor and viceroy of the West Indies
 1499–1502 – Francisco de Bobadilla, as governor of the West Indies
 1502–1509 – Nicolás de Ovando y Cáceres, as governor of the West Indies
 1509–1518 – Diego Columbus, as governor of the West Indies until 1511, thereafter as viceroy

Governor of New Spain
This office covered the territories that were claimed by Hernán Cortés. The office covered the territories that were under the control of the Governor of the Indies after 1524. 

 13 August 1521 – 24 December 1521 Hernán Cortés
 24 December 1521 – 30 December 1521 Cristóbal de Tapia
 30 December 1521 – 12 October 1524 Hernán Cortés, as governor and captain general from 15 October 1522
 12 October 1524 – 29 December 1524 Alonso de Estrada, Rodrigo de Albornoz, Alonso de Zuazo
 29 December 1524 – 17 February 1525 Gonzalo de Salazar, Pedro Almíndez Chirino, Alonso de Zuazo
 17 February 1525 – 20 April 1525 Gonzalo de Salazar, Pedro Almíndez Chirino, Alonso de Estrada, Rodrigo de Albornoz, Alonso de Zuazo
 20 April 1525 – 23 May 1525 Gonzalo de Salazar, Pedro Almíndez Chirino, Alonso de Zuazo
 24 May 1525 – 28 January 1526 Gonzalo de Salazar, Pedro Almíndez Chirino
 29 January 1526 – 24 June 1526 Alonso de Estrada, Rodrigo de Albornoz
 25 June 1526 – 3 July 1526 Hernán Cortés
 4 July 1526 – 16 July 1526 Luis Ponce de León
 16 July 1526 – 1 March 1527 Marcos de Aguilar
 2 March 1527 – 22 August 1527 Alonso de Estrada, Gonzalo de Sandoval, Luis de la Torre
 22 August 1527 – 8 December 1528 Alonso de Estrada, Luis de la Torre
 9 December 1528 – 21 December 1529 Nuño Beltrán de Guzmán, Juan Ortiz de Matienzo, Diego Delgadillo (the first Audiencia)
 21 December 1529 – 9 January 1531 Juan Ortiz de Matienzo, Diego Delgadillo (the first Audiencia)
 10 January 1531 – 16 April 1535 Sebastián Ramírez de Fuenleal, Vasco de Quiroga, Juan de Salmerón, Alonso de Maldonado, Francisco Ceinos (the second Audiencia)

Viceroys of New Spain (1535–1821) 
The first Viceroy of New Spain was appointed in 1535 to consolidate the offices of the Governor of the Indies and the Governor of New Spain into a single office.

See also
Mexico
History of Mexico
List of heads of state of Mexico
Spanish attempts to reconquer Mexico
Viceroyalty of New Spain 
Governor-General of the Philippines
Viceroyalty of Peru
Viceroyalty of the Río de la Plata
Viceroyalty of New Granada

External links
 List of viceroys and other colonial rulers at the Mexican government site
 Cronología de los Gobernantes de México 1325–2000 (Powerpoint)
 List of Spanish colonial officials before the viceroyalty

 
01

New Spain
New Spain, viceroys
Heads of state of Mexico
History of New Spain
Mexico history-related lists
16th-century Mexican people
17th-century Mexican people
18th-century Mexican people
19th-century Mexican people
Viceroy of New Spain
Viceroy of New Spain
16th-century monarchs in North America
17th-century monarchs in North America
18th-century monarchs in North America
19th-century monarchs in North America
1492 establishments in the Spanish Empire
1524 disestablishments in the Spanish Empire
1521 establishments in New Spain
1821 disestablishments in New Spain